Abdelhadi Labäli (born 26 April 1993) is a Moroccan middle-distance runner. He competed in the 3000 metres event at the 2014 IAAF World Indoor Championships. In 2016 he was banned from competition for two years as a result of irregularities in his biological passport.

References

External links
 

1993 births
Living people
Moroccan male middle-distance runners
Place of birth missing (living people)
Athletes (track and field) at the 2010 Summer Youth Olympics
Doping cases in athletics
Moroccan sportspeople in doping cases